Tonnoiraptera is a genus of crane fly in the family Limoniidae.

Distribution
New Zealand.

Species
T. neozelandica (Tonnoir, 1926)

References

Limoniidae
Diptera of Australasia